Christianity in Mongolia is a minority religion. As of 2005, the United States Department of State reports that approximately 24,000 Christians live in Mongolia's capital, Ulaanbaatar, which is around 2.5 percent of the entire registered population of the city. There are 196 churches by the year 2018.

Most Christians in Mongolia became Christian after the Mongolian Revolution of 1990. According to the Christian missionary group Barnabas Fund, the number of Christians grew from just four in 1989 to around 40,000 as of 2008.

Statistics 
According to the 2010 National Census there were 41,117 Christians (age of 15 and older) or 2.1% of total population.

Nestorianism

In the 7th century, Nestorianism was the first form of Christianity to be proselytized among the Mongols, although it was a minority religion and remained so. However, it had great philosophical influence on other Mongolian spiritual traditions, such as Buddhism and shamanism.

At least a dozen Mongols incorporated Christian elements into their spiritual lives. 

During the rise of the Mongol Empire in the 13th century, the Great Khans, though mostly Shamanists and Buddhist, were religiously tolerant towards the Nestorian Christians, Muslims, and Manichaeans.  Many of the khans had Nestorian Christian wives from the Kerait clan, who were extremely influential in the Mongol court.  During the rule of Möngke Khan, Christianity was the primary religious influence.  After the breakup of the Mongol Empire in the 14th century, Nestorian Christianity nearly disappeared from the region.

There are only very few archeological traces of the prospering of Nestorianism among the Mongols. In Inner Mongolia, several Nestorian gravestones have been recorded in the past, but none now remain in situ.

Eastern Orthodoxy
The Orthodox Churches and their monks became victims to the Mongol invasion of Eastern Europe in the early 13th century. However, Jarlig or charter of immunity, also contributed to the strengthening of the Church. With the reign of Möngke-Temür, a jarlig was issued to Metropolitan Kirill for the Orthodox Church in 1267. While the church had been under the de facto protection of the Mongols ten years earlier (from the 1257 census conducted under Khan Berke), this jarlig formally decreed protection for the Orthodox Church. More importantly, it officially exempted the church from any form of taxation by Mongol or Russian authorities and permitted clergymen to remain unregistered during censuses and clergy were furthermore not liable for forced labor or military service. For the first time, the Orthodox church would become less dependent on princely powers than in any other period of Russian history.

From 1771 to 1845 at least eight missions of the Russian Orthodox Church visited Mongolia. The first Orthodox church on Mongolian territory, Holy Trinity Church was established in the Khalkha capital city Urga in 1872, and newly rebuilt there in 2007.

Roman Catholicism

Historically, much of Europe had been ruled by Turkish and Mongolian tribes both of which originated in Mongolia. The Eastern Roman Empire was conquered by the Ottoman Turks in the 15th century.
Western Catholicism was first introduced in the Middle Ages, primarily through Franciscan and Dominican missionaries, sent to the Mongol court in Karakorum and also via medieval Roman Catholic missions in China. Missionaries to China were successful during the Mongol-created Yuan Dynasty in China in the late 13th/early 14th centuries. However, after the native Chinese Ming Dynasty overthrew the Yuan Dynasty in 1368, Christians were expelled from China.  Many Mongols in the western part of the Empire converted to Islam, and with the collapse of the entire Mongol Empire in the 14th century, Christianity nearly disappeared from Central Asia, only reappearing after the Second Opium War in the mid-19th century. In time, a mission was founded for Outer Mongolia, giving Mongolia its first Roman Catholic jurisdiction, but all work ceased within a year when the Mongolian People's Republic was established and freedom of thought and religion were no longer permitted.

After the Mongolian Revolution of 1990, Roman Catholic missionaries returned and rebuilt the church from scratch. As of 2006, there is an Apostolic Prefecture, a bishop, three churches, and diplomatic relations between the Holy See and Mongolia since 1992. Pope John Paul II originally planned to visit Mongolia along with Kazan, but he eventually cancelled the trip, supposedly explaining to a Russian newspaper that "Our Lord does not want it". By 2014, there were 919 Catholics in the Prefecture Apostolic of Ulaanbaatar, headed by Wenceslao Selga Padilla, C.I.C.M. as Prefect and organized into 6 parishes.

Protestantism

Most Christians in Mongolia today are Protestant, and most have become Christians since the Mongolian Revolution of 1990. Mongolia has a local Christian TV station, Eagle Television, and a pro-Christian radio station, Family Radio.

The Church of Jesus Christ of Latter-day Saints

In 1992, six missionaries of the Church of Jesus Christ of Latter-day Saints arrived in Mongolia as English teachers. In 1995, the Mongolia Ulaanbaatar Mission was established with Richard Cook as the first mission president. The Ulaanbaatar Mongolia West Stake with six congregations was formed in 2009 growing to nine congregations by May 2016. The Ulaanbaatar Mongolia East Stake was created in May 2016 with six congregations. About 2010 new visa laws went into effect limiting foreigners causing many of the foreign Church of Jesus Christ of Latter-day Saints missionaries to be reassigned to other countries. There were, however, about 110 Mongolian missionaries serving full time missions inside Mongolia.  By the end of 2015, the Church of Jesus Christ of Latter-day Saints had 11,250 members in twenty-three congregations.

See also 
 Christianity in Inner Mongolia

References

External links

Mongolian Missions Collection 1913-1935